DM1 can refer to

 Diabetes mellitus type 1
 A form of Myotonic dystrophy
 Myotonin-protein kinase, that is, dystrophia myotonica 1 or dystrophia myotonica protein kinase, a ubiquitous protein whose abnormal expression is associated with myotonic dystrophy in ways not yet well understood
 Mertansine, a maytansinoid cytotoxic agent used in trastuzumab emtansine and other antibody-drug conjugates
 The Lippisch DM-1 a German delta wing research glider
 An office based variant of the ICL Series 39 mainframe manufactured by International Computers Limited (ICL) in the 1980s
 SpaceX DM1, an orbital test of Dragon 2 spacecraft
 DM-1, one of the designations carried by a US Navy destroyer